Lucie Lucas is a French actress, producer, and former model. She's best known for being Clémentine Boissier in French TV Series Clem, alongside Victoria Abril.

Early life
Lucas started taking acting classes at age 9. During her teenage years, she was part of a modeling agency.

Career
Lucas's first role in a movie was 15 ans et demi in 2007.

In 2010, she got the main role, Clémentine Boissier, on in French TV Series Clem, a 16-year-old who gets pregnant. This was supposed to be a TV movie but with the success it had, producers decided to make it a TV series and since 2011, there is one season every year, at first composed of three episodes, and five since season 4.

In December 2013, she was amongst the celebrities appearing on a television special of TV series .

Personal life 
She met her future husband, Adrien, at the age of 13 in school, but they did not get together until they were 19 years old. They have three children, Lilou (born in August 2010), Moïra (born in January 2012) and Milo (born in March 2018). She lives in the countryside, in a small town in the east of Côtes-d'Armor, where she owns an ecological farm.

Filmography

References

Further reading

External links

1986 births
21st-century French actresses
Living people
French film actresses
French television actresses
People from Asnières-sur-Seine